Brand New Girlfriend is the second album from country music artist Steve Holy. It was released in 2006 on Curb Records. Prior to its release, Holy had charted five singles ("I'm Not Breakin'", "Rock-a-Bye Heart", "Put Your Best Dress On", "Go Home", and "It's My Time (Waste It If I Want To)") which were not released on albums, although they all charted.

The title track to Brand New Girlfriend became Holy's second Number One single on the Billboard Hot Country Songs charts, a position that it held for one week. At the time, its thirty-six-week climb to Number One was the slowest climb to Number One since the inception of Nielsen SoundScan in 1990. This record was broken one year later by Tracy Lawrence's "Find Out Who Your Friends Are", which reached Number One on its forty-first chart week. "Brand New Girlfriend" also reached No. 40 on the Billboard Hot 100 and No. 60 on the Pop 100.

Following the title track, two other singles — "Come On Rain" and "Men Buy the Drinks (Girls Call the Shots)" — were released from this album, both peaking in the lower regions of the top 40 on the country charts. Also included is a cover of "All for the Love of Sunshine", which was previously a Number One country hit for Hank Williams, Jr. (and the Mike Curb Congregation) in 1970, while the song "Wrap Around" was originally recorded by Keith Anderson on his 2005 album Three Chord Country and American Rock & Roll.

Critical reception
Jeffrey B. Remz of Country Standard Time gave the album a mixed review, saying that he considered Holy's performances strongest on the more traditionally-influenced songs and the title track.

Track listing

Personnel

 Kelly Back – electric guitar
 David Biondolillo – background vocals
 Matt Bissonette – bass guitar
 Christi Black – background vocals
 Bruce Bouton – steel guitar
 Jim "Moose" Brown – keyboards
 Steve Bryant – bass guitar
 Joe Chemay – bass guitar
 Jim Cox – piano
 Eric Darken – percussion
 Chip Davis – background vocals
 Bill Decker – background vocals
 Dan Dugmore – steel guitar
 Mike Durham – electric guitar
 Gary Falcone – background vocals
 Thom Flora – background vocals
 Larry Franklin – fiddle
 Ellis Hall – background vocals
 Tommy Harden – drums
 Connie Harrington – background vocals
 Wes Hightower – background vocals
 John Hobbs – Hammond organ
 Steve Holy – lead vocals
 Joanna Janét – background vocals
 John Barlow Jarvis – piano
 John Jorgenson – electric guitar
 Laurence Juber – acoustic guitar
 Wayne Killius – drums, percussion
 Troy Lancaster – electric guitar
 Paul Leim – drums
 Greg Leisz – steel guitar
 Chris Leuzinger – electric guitar
 Michael Lloyd – background vocals
 Debbie Lytton – background vocals
 Gordon Mote – Hammond organ, piano
 Jimmy Nichols – strings
 Melissa Pierce – background vocals
 David Pruitt – background vocals
 Brent Rowan – electric guitar
 Curt Ryle – acoustic guitar
 Scotty Sanders – steel guitar
 John D. Sharp – background vocals
 John R. Sharp – background vocals
 Gary Stockdale – background vocals
 Bryan Sutton – acoustic guitar
 Carmen Twillie – background vocals
 Wanda Vick – mandolin
 Dennis Wage – keyboards
 Chris Wann – background vocals
 Scott Williamson – drums
 Monalisa Young – background vocals
 Jonathan Yudkin – banjo

Production
 Lee Thomas Miller - tracks 1, 4, 5, 6, 7, 10, 11
 Doug Johnson - tracks 2, 3, 8
 Michael Lloyd and Mike Curb - tracks 9, 12

Chart performance

Album

Singles

References

2006 albums
Curb Records albums
Steve Holy albums